Wagler's toucanet (Aulacorhynchus wagleri) is a species of bird in the toucan family Ramphastidae. It is endemic to southwestern Mexico.

Taxonomy and systematics

Wagler's toucanet was originally described in the genus Pteroglossus. It was long considered one of many subspecies of the then emerald toucanet (Aulacorhynchus prasinus sensu lato). In 2008 the International Ornithological Committee (IOC) split 10 of those subspecies to create seven new species, one of which is Wagler's toucanet, and retained four of them as subspecies of their current emerald toucanet sensu stricto. BirdLife International's Handbook of the Birds of the World concurred. However, the North and South American Classification Committees of the American Ornithological Society and the Clements taxonomy declined to follow them. In 2017 they did split the emerald toucanet into two species, the northern (A. prasinus) and southern (A. albivitta) emerald-toucanets, each with seven subspecies. They treat "Wagler's" as a subspecies of the northern emerald-toucanet.

Wagler's toucanet as defined by the IOC is monotypic.

Description

Like other toucans, Wagler's toucanet is brightly colored and has a large bill. The sexes are alike in appearance, although the female generally is smaller and slightly shorter-billed. Their bill is black with a wide yellow stripe along its culmen and an orangey brown vertical stripe at its base. Their plumage is mainly green like that of other members of genus Aulacorhynchus, and is somewhat lighter below than above. Their forecrown is yellowish white darkening to olive on the crown and lightening down the nape. Their eye is dark reddish brown surrounded by even darker bare skin. Their lower face and throat are white with some blue as they transition to the underparts. Their undertail coverts and the underside of the tail are chestnut. The base of their tail's upper surface is green becoming blue towards the end and the tips of the feathers are chestnut. Immatures are grayer than adults and the chestnut of the tail tips is browner and smaller.

Distribution and habitat

Wagler's toucanet is found in the Sierra Madre del Sur of southwestern Mexico's Guerrero and the western part of Oaxaca states. It primarily inhabits humid montane forest but is also found in more open landscapes like secondary forest, shrublands, pastures, and plantations.

Behavior

Movement

Wagler's toucanet is non-migratory.

Social behavior

Wagler's toucanet is gregarious and frequently gathers in groups of up to about 10.

Feeding

Wagler's toucanet forages by gleaning, usually while perched. Its diet is eclectic and includes a wide variety of fruits, invertebrates of many orders, and vertebrate prey such as birds, eggs, lizards, and snakes.

Breeding

The breeding season of Wagler's toucanet is from March to July. It nests in tree cavities, either natural or those abandoned by woodpeckers. The typical clutch size is three or four but can range from one to five. Both sexes incubate the eggs but the female does so more than the male. The incubation period is 16 days and fledging occurs 42 to 45 days after hatch.

Vocal and non-vocal sounds

The main vocalization of Wagler's toucanet is "low, frog-like notes, repeated steadily, rronk- rronk- rronk or wup-wup-wup...often with more emphatic notes thrown in to break up an otherwise monotonous repetition". In flight its wings make a whirring sound.

Status

The IUCN has assessed Wagler's toucanet as being of Least Concern. Though its population size is not known, it is believed to be stable. No immediate threats have been identified. However, it "is vulnerable to habitat destruction" and "subject to special protection" under Mexican law.

References

Aulacorhynchus
Birds described in 1841